HMS Imperieuse (1852) was a wooden screw steam frigate launched in 1852. From 1854 the ship served in the Baltic Sea during the Crimean War.

On 1 April 1855, Imperieuse ran aground off the Reefness Lighthouse (Røsnæs lighthouse), in Kalundborg, Denmark.

In January 1860 she arrived at Hong Kong on the East Indies and China Station, where she remained for the next two years, operating off the coast of China during the Second Anglo-Chinese War of 1856–1860.

In August 1861, she ran aground on a rock  from Jeddo, Japan. The ship was sold in March 1867.

References

External links
 Watercolour of HMS Imperieuse at Hong Kong, 1860

1852 ships
Ships built in Deptford
Frigates of the Royal Navy
Age of Sail frigates of the United Kingdom
Crimean War naval ships of the United Kingdom
Maritime incidents in April 1855
Maritime incidents in August 1861